Hiromi Kawabata (川畑宏美, born 23 March 1979) is a Japanese former basketball player who competed in the 2004 Summer Olympics.

References

1979 births
Living people
Japanese women's basketball players
Olympic basketball players of Japan
Basketball players at the 2004 Summer Olympics
Basketball players at the 2002 Asian Games
Asian Games competitors for Japan